Abietinaria is a genus of hydrozoans belonging to the family Sertulariidae.

The genus has almost cosmopolitan distribution.

Species
Species:

Abietinaria abietina 
Abietinaria alexanderi 
Abietinaria alternitheca 
Abietinaria anguina 
Abietinaria annulata 
Abietinaria compressa 
Abietinaria crassiparia 
Abietinaria cruciformis 
Abietinaria derbeki 
Abietinaria elsaeoswaldae 
Abietinaria expansa 
Abietinaria filicula 
Abietinaria fusca 
Abietinaria gagarae 
Abietinaria gigantea 
Abietinaria gracilis 
Abietinaria immersa 
Abietinaria inconstans 
Abietinaria interversa 
Abietinaria juniperus 
Abietinaria kincaidi 
Abietinaria laevimarginata 
Abietinaria macrotheca 
Abietinaria melo 
Abietinaria merkii 
Abietinaria pacifica 
Abietinaria pulchra 
Abietinaria raritheca 
Abietinaria rigida 
Abietinaria smirnowi 
Abietinaria spasskii
Abietinaria spiralis 
Abietinaria thuiarioides 
Abietinaria thuiaroides 
Abietinaria traski 
Abietinaria trigona 
Abietinaria turgida 
Abietinaria variabilis

References

Sertulariidae
Hydrozoan genera